Navicula dobrinatemniskovae is an algal species in the genus Navicula, known from inland waters of the Antarctic  region. The species was named after Prof. Dsc Dobrina Temniskova from the University of Sofia

References

Further reading
Sterken, Mieke, et al. "An illustrated and annotated checklist of freshwater diatoms (Bacillariophyta) from Livingston, Signy and Beak Island (Maritime Antarctic Region)." Plant Ecology and Evolution 148.3 (2015): 431-455.
Kopalová, Kateřina, and Bart van de Vijver. "Structure and ecology of freshwater benthic diatom communities from Byers Peninsula, Livingston Island, South Shetland Islands." Antarctic science 25.02 (2013): 239-253.
Zidarova, Ralitsa, Kopalová, Kateřina, and Bart van de Vijver. "Diatoms from the Antarctic Region, Maritime Antarctica". Iconographia Diatomologica Vol. 24, Koeltz Botanical Books, 504p.

External links

AlgaeBase

dobrinatemniskovae
Protists described in 2011